Buffalo Rider is a 1976 American Western film co-directed by John Fabian, George Lauris and Dick Robinson. The films character of Buffalo Jones bears no relation to Charles "Buffalo" Jones who the producers did not know existed until years after.

Plot
Buffalo Rider Tells the story of a man named Buffalo Jones with Rick Guinn playing the role of Jones.  Jones is depicted as a loner who tames and rides a buffalo and hunts down murderous buffalo hunters.

Cast
 Rick Guinn as Jake "Buffalo" Jones
 John Freeman as Frank Nesbitt
 Rich Scheeland as Ralph Pierce
 George Sager as Ted Clayborn
 Dick Robinson as Sam Robinson
 Priscilla Lauris as Mrs. Robinson
 C. Lindsay Workman (voice) as Narrator
 Hal Smith (voice) as Old buffalo hunter

Reception
The film has received negative reviews. Chris Higgins of Mental Floss wrote that "given all the animal 'stunts' (including what sure looks like actually shooting buffalo and various cross-species animal fights) it wouldn't pass muster today. The movie itself is a bit sub par, featuring an extreme over-reliance on narration and a sort of meandering documentary-ish treatment with some buffalo-related dramatic elements tossed in." The film was featured in a Gizmodo article of "the weirdest thing on the internet tonight" where Andrew Tarantola wrote, "Enjoy the heartwarming tale of a man, conveniently named Buffalo Jones, and his buffalo, named Buffalo. No wait. Its name is Samson, because that's so much more original. Whatever you call them, the two chum around the American frontier, saving babies and stuff for an hour and a half (even though the script was apparently only about 15 pages long)."

In popular culture
On November 22, 2011, the film was released as a video on demand from RiffTrax. This edition features a satirical commentary done by comedians and actors Michael J. Nelson, Kevin Murphy and Bill Corbett.

In 2011, the Austin-based band The Possum Posse created "Guy on a Buffalo", a narrated song set to clips from the movie Buffalo Rider. A clip from Part 3 of "Guy on a Buffalo" was used in Season 3 Episode 6 "All For Nothing" of the hit series Yellowstone inspiring the ranch hands to try and go buffalo riding

See also
Revisionist Western
Bison

References

External links

Complete movie on Archive.org
Theatrical and TV trailers

1978 films
1978 Western (genre) films
American Western (genre) films
Rediscovered American films
1970s rediscovered films
1970s English-language films
1970s American films